Ardatovsky District (Ordańbuje; , Ardatovań ajmak) is an administrative and municipal district (raion), one of the twenty-two in the Republic of Mordovia, Russia. It is located in the northeast of the republic. Its administrative center is the town of Ardatov. As of the 2010 Census, the total population of the district was 29,446, with the population of Ardatov accounting for 31.9% of that number.

Administrative and municipal status
Within the framework of administrative divisions, Ardatovsky District is one of the twenty-two in the republic. It is divided into one town of district significance (Ardatov), one work settlement (an administrative division with the administrative center in the work settlement (inhabited locality) of Turgenevo), and twenty-one selsoviets, all of which comprise fifty-four rural localities. As a municipal division, the district is incorporated as Ardatovsky Municipal District. The town of district significance of Ardatov and Turgenevo Work Settlement are incorporated into two urban settlements, and the twenty-one selsoviets are incorporated into twenty-one rural settlements within the municipal district. The town of Ardatov serves as the administrative center of both the administrative and municipal district.

Notable residents 

Stepan Erzia (1876–1959), Mordvin sculptor

References

Notes

Sources



 
Districts of Mordovia